Ahmed Al Mousa is a former Saudi Arabian footballer. He started his career with Al Ittihad before joining Al-Wahda. He led Al Wahda to third place in the regular season before beating defending champions Al Shabab in the quarter-finals of the league championship play-off.

International career
Ahmed played for Saudi Arabia national football team at the 2007 AFC Asian Cup and 2009 Gulf Cup of Nations.

International goals

Family
He is the brother of Al Ahli’s Motaz and Al Wahda’s Kamil.

Notes and references

Living people
1981 births
Saudi Arabian footballers
Saudi Arabia international footballers
2007 AFC Asian Cup players
Association football midfielders
Wej SC players
Ittihad FC players
Al-Wehda Club (Mecca) players
Al-Fateh SC players
Saudi Professional League players
Sportspeople from Mecca